Haranath (2 September 1936 – 1 November 1989) was an Indian actor who worked in Telugu films.

Early life career and death
Haranath was born on 2 September 1936 in Raparthi near Pithapuram and Gollaprolu in East Godavari district. He had two younger brothers and a sister. His early schooling was in Madras till pre-university, and he did his B. A. degree in P R College, Kakinada. He was very active in cultural activities, particularly dramas, won many a drama competition. An encounter leads him into films. He was waiting at Vanimahal bus stop in Madras, on the way to pilot training when he was spotted by Mukkmamala Krishna Murthy, famous film actor, director and producer and was selected to act as a lead actor in the film Rushyasrunga. But his second film Maa Inti Mahalakshmi was the first film to be released. He was a very popular Tollywood lead actor in the 60s being regarded as a romantic icon. He acted in classic films like Amarasilipi Jakkana, Letha Manasulu, Chitti Chellelu, Aada Janma, Maa Inti Devatha, Bhishma, Pandava Vanavasam, Abhimanyu and several others in lead roles. He was the hero of the first film shot at Saradhi Studios in Hyderabad, Ma Inti Mahalakshmi (1959). He played the role of Lord Sri Rama in the film Seetha Rama Kalyanam, produced by N.T. Rama Rao under the banner, National Art Theatres, in which NTR acted as Ravana. He also played the role of Lord Krishna in the 1962 film Bhishma and as Sri Rama in Sri Rama Katha (1969). He had acted in about 117 Telugu films, 12 Tamil films, one Hindi and Kannada movie each. He has played in many films opposite Jamuna. His last film was Thoduallulu in 1989. He produced one movie named Maa Inti Devatha released in 1981.

Filmography
Maa Inti Mahalakshmi (1959)
Runanubandham (1960)
Sri Seetha Rama Kalyanam (1961) as Rama
Kalasivunte Kaladu Sukham (1961)
Kula Mangai (1961) - Tamil
Pellikani Pillalu (1961)
Rushyasrunga (1961)
Gundamma Katha (1962)  as  Prabhakar, son of Gundamma
Manithan Maravillai (1962) - Tamil Version of Gundamma Katha
Bhishma (1962)  as Krishna
Aatma Bandhuvu (1962) as Madhu
Annai (1962) - Tamil  -  as   Selvam son of Bhanumathi and Sowcar Janaki
Sumaithaangi (1962) - Tamil
Madana Kamaraju Katha (1962)
Manthiri Kumaran (1962) - Tamil
Pempudu Kuthuru (1963)
Amara Shilpi Jakkanna (1964) as Dankkanna
Murali Krishna (1964)
Pandava Vanavasam (1965) as Abhimanyu
Chandrahasa (1965)
Naadee Aada Janme (1965)
Leta Manasulu (1966) as Sekhar
Bhimanjaneya Yuddham (1966) as Lord Krishna
Palnati Yudham (1966) as Balachandrudu
Monagallaku Monagadu (1966) as Ramesh
Saraswati Sabatham (1966) - Tamil
Bhakta Prahlada (1967) as Vishnu
Bhakta Prahlada (1967) as Vishnu - Tamil 
Bhakt Prahlad (1967) as Vishnu - Hindi
Chadarangam (1967)
Peddakkayya (1967)
Sri Sri Sri Maryada Ramanna (1967)
Punyavati (1967)
Aada Paduchu (1967)
Rahasyam (1967) as Narada
Bangaru Sankellu (1968)
Challani Needa (1968)
Nadimantrapu Siri (1968)
Sukha Dukhalu (1968)
Bandhavyalu (1968)
Palamanasulu (1968)
Pelli Roju (1968)
Muhurtha Balam (1969)
Manushulu Marali (1969)
Sri Rama Katha (1969)  as Sri Rama
Pratheekaram (1969)
Kathanayika Molla (1970)
Chitti Chellelu (1970)
Aada Janma (1970)
Basti Kiladilu (1970)
Sridevi (1970)
Engirundho Vandhaal (1970) - Tamil
Thalli Thandrulu (1970)
Bhale Papa (1971)
Pattindalla Bangaram (1971)
Pagapattina paduchu 1971
Matrumoorti (1972)
Bala Bharatam (1972) as Narada
Maa Inti Kodalu (1972)
Bhakta Prahlada (1967) as Vishnu - Kannada
Maa Inti Devatha (1980)
Gadasari Atta Sogasari Kodalu (1981) as Chandram
Kayyala Ammayi Kalavaari Abbayi (1982)
Kalavari Samsaram (1982)
Bangaru Koduku (1982) as Murthy
Bangaru Bhoomi (1982)
Naagu (1984) as Soori
Kotha Pelli Koothuru (1985)
Tandra Paparayudu (1986)
Thodallullu (1988)

References

External links
 
 

Telugu male actors
1936 births
1989 deaths
Male actors in Telugu cinema